Aji Imbut Stadium or Perjiwa Stadium, before the official name revealed also known as Tenggarong Madya Stadium, is a multi-purpose stadium in Tenggarong, Kutai Kartanegara Regency, East Kalimantan, Indonesia. Completed in 2008, it is mainly used mostly for football matches.  The stadium has a capacity of 35,000 spectators.

References

External links
Stadium information and pictures

Kutai Kartanegara Regency
Sports venues in East Kalimantan
Football venues in East Kalimantan
Athletics (track and field) venues in Indonesia
Athletics (track and field) venues in East Kalimantan
Multi-purpose stadiums in East Kalimantan
Sports venues completed in 2008
2008 establishments in Indonesia